Richard George Koppenhaver (April 7, 1931 – July 23, 2017) was an American football player and coach.  He served as the head football coach at Valley City State University in Valley City, North Dakota from 1962 to 1964.

Koppenhaver later served as an assistant football coach and athletic director at North Dakota State University. He also served as an assistant coach at the University of North Dakota during their 2001 championship season.

Head coaching record

References

1931 births
2017 deaths
American football quarterbacks
Minnesota State Mavericks athletic directors
North Central Conference commissioners
North Dakota Fighting Hawks baseball players
North Dakota Fighting Hawks football coaches
North Dakota Fighting Hawks football players
North Dakota State Bison football coaches
North Dakota State Bison athletic directors
Valley City State Vikings football coaches
High school football coaches in North Dakota
People from Adams County, North Dakota
Players of American football from North Dakota